Doxospira hertleini is a species of sea snail, a marine gastropod mollusk in the family Pseudomelatomidae, the turrids and allies.

Description
The length of the shell attains 50 mm.

Distribution
This species occurs in the Pacific Ocean off Costa Rica and Panama.

References

 Shasky, D.R. (1971) Ten new species of tropical Eastern Pacific Turridae. The Veliger, 14, 67–72, 1 pl

External links
 
 

hertleini
Gastropods described in 1971